Conasprella orbignyi, common name Orbigny's (false) cone, is a species of sea snail, a marine gastropod mollusk in the family Conidae, the cone snails and their allies.

Like all species within the genus Conus, these snails are predatory and venomous. They are capable of "stinging" humans, therefore live ones should be handled carefully or not at all.

There is one subspecies : Conus orbignyi elokismenos Kilburn, 1975 (invalid synonym : Conus orbignyi aratus Kilburn, 1973 ). This subspecies is considered a species in the World Register of Marine Species as Conus elokismenos Kilburn, 1975.

Description
The size of the shell varies between 32 mm and 88 mm.

Distribution
This marine species occurs in the Indo-Pacific (Madagascar, Mozambique, South Africa, Réunion, Eastern India, Japan, New Caledonia, Philippines, Papua New Guinea, Taiwan) and off Australia (Northern Territory, Queensland, Western Australia)

References

 d'Orbigny, A., 1831. Première partie. Classe 5. Mollusques. Magasin de Zoologie
 Wilson, B. 1994. Australian Marine Shells. Prosobranch Gastropods. Kallaroo, WA : Odyssey Publishing Vol. 2 370 pp.
 Röckel, D., Korn, W. & Kohn, A.J. 1995. Manual of the Living Conidae. Volume 1: Indo-Pacific Region. Wiesbaden : Hemmen 517 pp. 
 Puillandre N., Meyer C.P., Bouchet P. & Olivera B.M. (2011) Genetic divergence and geographic variation in the deep-water Conus orbignyi complex (Mollusca: Conoidea). Zoologica Scripta 40(4): 350–363
 Filmer R.M. (2001). A Catalogue of Nomenclature and Taxonomy in the Living Conidae 1758 - 1998. Backhuys Publishers, Leiden. 388pp.
 Tucker J.K. (2009). Recent cone species database. September 4, 2009 Edition
 Puillandre N., Duda T.F., Meyer C., Olivera B.M. & Bouchet P. (2015). One, four or 100 genera? A new classification of the cone snails. Journal of Molluscan Studies. 81: 1–23

External links
 The Conus Biodiversity website
 Cone Shells – Knights of the Sea
 
 Holotype in MNHN, Paris

orbignyi
Gastropods described in 1831